Zadlaz–Žabče is a settlement in the hills northeast of Tolmin in the Littoral region of Slovenia. It is accessible by road through the village of Žabče.

References

External links
Zadlaz–Žabče on Geopedia

Populated places in the Municipality of Tolmin